The Ireland cricket team are scheduled to tour Sri Lanka in April 2023 to play two Test matches.
Initially, Ireland were scheduled to play a Test match along with two One Day International (ODI) matches. In March 2023, following a request from Sri Lanka Cricket, the schedule was changed to include a second Test instead of the two ODI matches.

Squads

Test series

1st Test

2nd Test

References

External links
 Series home at ESPNcricinfo

International cricket competitions in 2022–23
2023 in Sri Lankan cricket
2023 in Irish cricket